George Joseph Melinkovich (July 5, 1911 – May 27, 1994) was an American football player and coach. He was an All-American fullback at the University of Notre Dame in 1932 and the head football coach at Utah State University from 1949 to 1950.

Melinkovich played high school football in Tooele, Utah, and then played college football for the Notre Dame Fighting Irish in 1931, 1932, and 1934. He was selected by Liberty magazine and Parke H. Davis as a first-team fullback on the 1932 College Football All-America Team.

Melinkovich served as a high school football coach in New Jersey for several years, and he then served as the head coach for the Utah State Aggies football team in 1949 and 1950, compiling a record of 5–16 at Utah State. He also coached football at Judge Memorial Catholic High School in Salt Lake City and later moved to California and worked as a teacher in Los Angeles for 20 years. He was inducted into the Utah Sports Hall of Fame in 1990. He died in 1994 at age 82 in Los Angeles.

Head coaching record

References

1911 births
1994 deaths
American football fullbacks
American football halfbacks
Notre Dame Fighting Irish football players
Utah State Aggies football coaches
High school football coaches in New Jersey
High school football coaches in Utah
People from Tooele, Utah
Coaches of American football from Utah
Players of American football from Utah